The 1st Seiyu Awards ceremony was held on March 3, 2007 at the Akiba 3D Theater in Akihabara, Tokyo. General voting categories had 10 nominations each for Best Lead (actor/actress), Best Supporting (actor/actress), Rookie (actor/actress), Singing, and Personality.  Special Achievement, Achievement, and Synergy Awards were selected by the event without nominations.  The period of general voting lasted from October 21, 2006 to January 10, 2007.  

Winners are listed below.

The First Seiyu Awards Nominees

References

Seiyu Awards ceremonies
Seiyu
Seiyu
2007 in Japanese cinema
2007 in Japanese television